The 1988 Tripura Legislative Assembly election took place in a single phase on 2 February 1988 to elect the Members of the Legislative Assembly (MLA) from each of the 60 Assembly Constituencies (ACs) in Tripura, India. More than 100 individuals were killed in election-related violence in the state of Tripura.  Government and TNV representatives agreed to a cessation of military hostilities on August 12, 1988.  Several thousand individuals were killed, and some 200,000 individuals were displaced during the conflict.

Highlights
Election to the Tripura Legislative Assembly were held on February 2, 1988.  The election were held in a single phase for all the 60 assembly constituencies.

Participating Political Parties

National Parties
 BJP (Bharatiya Janata Party)
 CPI (Communist Party of India)
 CPM (Communist Party of India (Marxist))
 INC (Indian National Congress)
 JNP (Janata Party)

State Parties
 FBL (All India Forward Bloc)
 RSP (Revolutionary Socialist Party)
 TUS (Tripura Upajati Juba Samiti)

No. of constituencies

Electors

Performance of women candidates

Result

Constituency wise winners

Government formation
Indian National Congress (INC) – Tripura Upajati Juba Samiti (TUJS) coalition won 30 out of 60 seats in the Legislative Assembly.  The CPI-M won 28 seats in the Legislative Assembly.  Sudhir Ranjan Majumdar formed a INC-TUJS coalition government on February 5, 1988.

On February 17, 1992, the eight members of the Tripura Tribal Youth League (Tripura Upajati Juba Samiti-TUJS), who were part of the governing coalition in the 60-seat Legislative Assembly, resigned in protest over more than 500 starvation deaths in tribal areas in recent months.  Chief Minister Sudhir Ranjan Majumdar resigned on February 19, 1992, and Samir Ranjan Barman was sworn in as Chief Minister of an INC-TUJS coalition government on February 20, 1992.

Chief Minister Samir Ranjan Barman resigned on February 27, 1993, and the state of Tripura was placed under president's rule from March 11, 1993 to April 10, 1993.

References

State Assembly elections in Tripura
Tripura